12 Citizens is a 2014 Chinese suspense crime drama film directed by Xu Ang. It was shown at the 2014 Rome Film Festival on October 19, 2014 and was released in China on May 15, 2015. The plot is based on and heavily references the plot of the 1954 teleplay Twelve Angry Men by Reginald Rose. The major changes in the plot are changes brought forward and made more appropriate for a Chinese audience.

Plot 
On a hot summer's day, 12 male "citizens" undergo a mock jury for a law school's Western law subject. The mock jury need to decide whether a boy is guilty or not of a murder of his father with a knife based on the evidence. The evidence prepared by the students of the course seems airtight and therefore it seems as if the jury will render him guilty of the crime. However, one juror does not follow the consensus and appreciates the nuances and seriousness of the verdict. His motives are unclear but he wants to entertain the thought that there is reasonable doubt about the guilt of the boy. As a result, the evidence is slowly cross-referenced and examined. Conflicts are spurred as a result of their differing personalities and strong opinions. Eventually, one by one, the jurors are convinced that there is reasonable doubt and judge the boy to be not guilty. On the end of the mock jury trial, the jurors are visibly exhausted. The juror who had rebelled and wanted to see the case through is revealed to be a prosecutor of the People's Republic of China.

Cast

Reception
By May 16, 2015 the film had grossed  at the Chinese box office.

On Film Business Asia, Derek Elley gave the film a 9 out of 10, saying it "is superbly written and played."

In The Hollywood Reporter, Deborah Young comments on the ending of the movie, stating that "one can take issue with the glib final revelation about Juror No. 8, which rather explodes the film’s progressive democracy-by-the-people facade".

References

External links

2014 crime drama films
Chinese crime drama films
Chinese suspense films
Chinese remakes of foreign films
Twelve Citizens